George H. Taylor (born 1947) is the former director of the Oregon Climate Service at Oregon State University in Corvallis, a position he held from 1989 until his retirement on 1 May 2008.

Education and career
Born in Santa Barbara, California,
Taylor holds a B.A. in mathematics from the University of California, Santa Barbara (1969) and a M.S. in meteorology from the University of Utah (1975). In 1989, he became the director of the Oregon Climate Service at Oregon State University (OSU); in this capacity, he tracked weather and issued long-range weather forecasts for the state of Oregon. 
Beginning in 1991, he was popularly known as "Oregon's state climatologist." However, in 2007, the then-governor of Oregon, Ted Kulongoski, said that there was no such position in the state and demanded that Taylor stop using such a title, saying "he's not my weatherman".

Taylor was also the president of the American Association of State Climatologists from 1998 to 2000. In 2008, after he retired from OSU, he founded, and became the president of, the consulting firm Applied Climate Services, where he still worked as of February 2014.

Views on global warming
Taylor has expressed a skeptical position on global warming. While his position is at odds with the scientific consensus on the topic, he has argued that "consensus in science doesn't really mean much. What matters is the truth. Often consensus is wrong." 
Taylor considers global warming to be primarily caused by natural variability, not human activity, though he acknowledges that both have played a role. In 2005, Taylor testified before the Environment Committee of the Oregon House of Representatives in opposition to a bill that would increase the fuel efficiency standards for automobiles in Oregon to match California's. In his testimony, he said, "I believe the effect of greenhouse gas is a relatively minor one," and  "I really believe natural variation and natural factors are a bigger cause of climate change than you and I."

Personal life
Taylor is a vegetarian, rode a bike to Oregon State University when he worked there (as of 2007), and engages in many environmentalist practices.

References

External links
  Applied Climate Services

1947 births
American meteorologists
Oregon State University faculty
Living people
University of California, Santa Barbara alumni
University of Utah alumni
People from Santa Barbara, California